Bismarck Myrick (born December 23, 1940) is a former U.S. Ambassador to the Republic of Liberia (1999–2002) and Lesotho (1995–1998).  He is a career member of the Senior Foreign Service and a decorated Vietnam War hero. He represented the U.S. at the swearing in of South Africa's first democratic parliament, led by Nelson Mandela. The Kingdom of Lesotho conferred on him the Kingdom's highest honor to a non-citizen. Liberia's major newspapers and civil society organizations named him "Diplomat of the Year" or "Man of the Year" for three consecutive years. The City Council appointed him Goodwill Ambassador for Goree Island, Senegal in 2008. Portsmouth named two streets in his honor in 2001 and selected him as a 2006 "Portsmouth Notable" – the city's highest honor. He is featured in the March, 2013 edition of "The Citizen of Chesapeake" Newspaper. Active in community service, he is on a number of boards, such as the World Affairs Council.

Career 
A native of Portsmouth, Virginia, Myrick earned a bachelor's degree from the University of Tampa and a master's degree from Syracuse University. Spelman College awarded him a Doctor of Humane Letters degree.

Military 
Myrick began his military career as an army private. He performed military police duties in Okinawa and Germany before his first assignment as an infantry officer in South Korea. He was an infantry company commander in Vietnam from 1968 to 1969. He earned the Silver Star, two Bronze Stars for heroism in combat, two Bronze Stars for meritorious service in a combat zone, the Purple Heart, Meritorious Service Medal, Parachutist Badge and Combat Infantryman Badge. He was inducted into the U.S. Army Hall of Fame at Fort Benning, Georgia in 1996. An Army Foreign Area Officer (Africa Specialist), he was Director of African Studies at the School of International Studies, Fort Bragg, North Carolina. He is in the National Infantry Museum's Hall of Fame at Fort Benning, Georgia.  He was the ODU 2011 Veterans Day Honoree and Featured Speaker.

Foreign Service 
He joined the Foreign Service in 1980 and was assigned as Desk Officer for Somalia in the Office of East African Affairs. From 1982 to 1984, he served as Political Officer at Monrovia in Liberia. He returned to Washington, D.C. to serve from 1985 to 1987 as Action Officer in the Office of Strategic Nuclear Policy, Bureau of Politico-Military Affairs.  He was Chairman (1986–87) of the Interagency Nuclear Testing Arms Control Working Group and served on the U.S. Delegation to the Geneva Nuclear Testing talks.  Myrick served as Deputy Director for policy planning and coordination in the Bureau of Inter-American Affairs from 1987 to 1989.  In 1989, he was awarded a Una Chapman Cox Fellowship and conducted research on a project entitled "Change in the Horn of Africa and Implications for U.S. Foreign Policy in the 1990s."  He holds the Department of State's Superior Honor Award and four Meritorious Honor Awards.

While serving as the ambassador to Liberia, Myrick became the center of a potential international incident: after alleging that Myrick had interfered in domestic political issues, ruling National Patriotic Party chairman Cyril Allen urged the government to arrest Myrick.  Disputes erupted among NPP partisans, as some opposed the statement of their party boss and called for an increased separation between their party and the government.

The government of Lesotho awarded him the Most Meritorious Order of Mohlomi, its highest honor to a non-citizen, for his work in promoting democracy.  He also served as Principal Officer in Cape Town, South Africa from 1993 to 1995, and as Principal Officer in Durban, South Africa from 1990 to 1993, where he helped manage U.S. policies during that nation's transformation from apartheid to non-racial democracy.  During his military career, Myrick also served in Ethiopia from 1975 to 1979 as an Army foreign area officer.

Myrick is co-author of Three Aspects of Crisis in Colonial Kenya ; author of "The United States and Liberia" in The African Experience: Past, Present, and Future and author of scores of official documents.

Old Dominion University 
He currently teaches political science at Old Dominion University as an Ambassador-in-Residence and Lecturer.

References

External links

The Political Graveyard - Index to Politicians: Myerson to Myzell
U.S. Department of State Press Release, March 19, 2002 -- Bismarck Myrick biography

1940 births
Living people
United States Army personnel of the Vietnam War
People from Portsmouth, Virginia
Recipients of the Silver Star
Ambassadors of the United States to Liberia
African-American diplomats
Ambassadors of the United States to Lesotho
United States Foreign Service personnel
University of Tampa alumni
United States Army soldiers
20th-century African-American people
Maxwell School of Citizenship and Public Affairs alumni
21st-century African-American people
20th-century American diplomats
21st-century American diplomats